The Atchison, Topeka and Santa Fe Railway Depot in Magdalena, New Mexico was listed on the National Register of Historic Places in 1978.

It is located at 108 N. Main Street, located off U.S. Route 60.

It was built around 1915.

The station was central to the town, which was founded in 1884-85 when the Atchison, Topeka and Santa Fe Railroad arrived to terminate a branch line from Socorro to there.  It was to serve freight traffic of livestock and mining businesses.

The railway's tracks of the entire branch were removed in 1973 after freight traffic declined.  In 1978 the depot was Magdalena's village hall, and "almost the only railroad building remaining to recall the town's hey-day when it was the shipping point for large quantities of ore, livestock and wool and one of western New Mexico's most important communities."

In 2013 it was the village hall and library

References

Railway stations in the United States opened in 1915
National Register of Historic Places in Socorro County, New Mexico
Atchison, Topeka and Santa Fe Railway stations in New Mexico
Railway depots in the United States
Railway stations on the National Register of Historic Places in New Mexico